Gomelsky is a surname. Notable people with the surname include:

Alexander Gomelsky (1928–2005), Russian professional basketball player and coach
Evgeny Gomelsky (born 1938), Russian former professional basketball player and coach
Giorgio Gomelsky (1934–2016), film maker, impresario, music manager, songwriter (as Oscar Rasputin) and record producer
Vladimir Gomelsky (born 1953), Russian TV commentator, journalist, and writer

See also
Alexander Gomelsky Universal Sports Hall CSKA, multi-purpose indoor sporting arena in Moscow, Russia
Gomelsky Cup, annual basketball tournament held in Moscow in the autumn
Gomelsky Uyezd, one of the subdivisions of the Mogilev Governorate of the Russian Empire
Gomilsko